The Vacaville Reporter is a newspaper in the town of Vacaville, California. It also covers surrounding Solano County, California, including Fairfield, California and Dixon, California. The Rico family, who had owned the paper since 1935, sold the paper to MediaNews Group in 2002.

MediaNews Group merged and became Digital First Media.

References

External links
 Official site

MediaNews Group publications
Daily newspapers published in the San Francisco Bay Area
Vacaville, California
Mass media in Solano County, California